Darren Lea Heesom (born 8 May 1968) is an English former professional footballer. He played 38 matches in the Football League for Burnley before having spells with a number of non-league clubs, including Altrincham, Macclesfield Town and Southport.

References

1968 births
Living people
Footballers from Warrington
English footballers
Association football defenders
Burnley F.C. players
Altrincham F.C. players
Southport F.C. players
Macclesfield Town F.C. players
Witton Albion F.C. players
Hyde United F.C. players
Barrow A.F.C. players
English Football League players